Lamia Abbas Amara (also sometimes spelled Lamea Abbas Amara; 1929 – 18 June 2021) was an Iraqi poet. She was a pioneer of modern Arabic poetry and an important figure in contemporary poetry in Iraq.

Name

Lamia is her given name, while Abbas is her father's name, and Amara is her paternal grandfather's name.

Early life and education
She was born to a Mandaean family in Baghdad in 1929, and later grew up in Amarah. Her father was Bayan bar Manu. Her uncle Zahroun Amara (died 1929) was a famous silversmith, while her cousin Abdul Razzak Abdul Wahid (1930–2015) was also a poet.

Her mother, the sister of Sheikh Dakhil Aidan, belonged to the Manduia priestly lineage.

She studied at the Teachers' Training College, which later became part of the Baghdad University, and graduated in 1950.

Career
She was a member of the administrative board of the Iraqi Writers Union in Baghdad between 1963 and 1975, a member of the administrative board of the Syriac Synod in Baghdad, and deputy permanent representative of Iraq to UNESCO in Paris between 1973 and 1975, and director of culture and arts at the University of Technology in Baghdad.

She left Iraq in 1978 and lived most of her exile in San Diego, United States after emigrating during the time of Saddam Hussein. Her sister, Shafia Abbas Amara, also emigrated to San Diego.

Lamia Abbas specialized in Arabic eloquent and popular Iraqi poetry. She was awarded the National Order of the Cedar by the Lebanese state for her work. 

Together with her sister Shafia Abbas Amara, she published a magazine called Mandaee in the United States, which was mostly in Arabic but also partially in English.

Lamia Abbas owned several Mandaean manuscripts that were given to her by her maternal uncle, Dakhil Aidan. These manuscripts, including the Ginza Rabba (two copies dating to 1886 and 1935), Mandaean Book of John, and Book of the Zodiac, were studied by Jorunn Jacobsen Buckley. Buckley and Abbas were also lifelong friends.

Abbas died in the United States on 18 June 2021, aged 92.

Notes

References

1929 births
2021 deaths
Iraqi Mandaeans
20th-century Iraqi poets
Iraqi women poets
People from Baghdad
Recipients of the National Order of the Cedar
American people of Iraqi-Mandaean descent
Iraqi emigrants to the United States
Poets from California
Writers from San Diego
Iraqi book and manuscript collectors
People from Amarah